Base One International Corp. was an American company that specialized in developing software for constructing database applications and distributed computing systems. Headquartered in New York City, the company was founded in 1993 and expanded in 1997 through the founding of its subsidiary, Base One Software Pvt. Ltd., in Bangalore, India. Base One held a number of U.S. patents related to its technologies for distributed computing and high-precision arithmetic.

The company is most known for its Base One Foundation Component Library (BFC) product, which was a rapid application development (RAD) toolkit aimed at users of Microsoft Visual Studio in conjunction with any of the major commercial DBMS products from Microsoft, Oracle, IBM Db2, Sybase, or MySQL.

In 2014, Base One International sold its intellectual property to Content Galaxy Inc. and closed operations.

References

External links
 Official corporate website
 IDC INSIGHT. Base One: Grid Computing for Database-Centric Applications, Earl Joseph, Ph.D., John Humphreys, September 2004. Accessed April 10, 2008.
 Second Venture. The Top 50 Emerging Companies voted by 140 Venture Capital Funds & Angel Investors, December 14, 2004. Accessed April 10, 2008.
 FinanceTech. Base One Shares at SIA, June 23, 2005. Accessed April 10, 2008.
 NYSIA. On the Grid: A Report on Base One International Corporation, December 1, 2005. Accessed April 10, 2008.

International information technology consulting firms
Software companies based in New York (state)
Companies based in New York City
Defunct software companies of the United States
1993 establishments in the United States
1993 establishments in New York (state)
Software companies established in 1993
Companies established in 1993